Postmaster General of the United Kingdom was a Cabinet ministerial position in HM Government. Aside from maintaining the postal system, the Telegraph Act 1868 established the Postmaster General's right to exclusively maintain electric telegraphs. This would subsequently extend to telecommunications and broadcasting.

The office was abolished in 1969 by the Post Office Act 1969. A replacement public corporation, governed by a chairman, was established under the name of the Post Office (later subsumed by Royal Mail Group). The cabinet position of Postmaster General was replaced by a Minister of Posts and Telecommunications, with reduced powers, until 1974; most regulatory functions have now been delegated to the Secretary of State for Digital, Culture, Media and Sport, although Royal Mail Group was overseen by the Secretary of State for Business, Energy and Industrial Strategy before flotation.

History

In England, the monarch's letters to his subjects are known to have been carried by relays of couriers as long ago as the 15th century. The earliest mention of Master of the Posts is in the King's Book of Payments where a payment of £100 was authorised for Brian Tuke as master of the posts in February 1512. Belatedly, in 1517, he was officially appointed to the office of Governor of the King's Posts, a precursor to the office of Postmaster General of the United Kingdom, by Henry VIII. In 1609 it was decreed that letters could only be carried and delivered by persons authorised by the Postmaster General.

In 1655 John Thurloe became Postmaster-General, a post he held until he was accused of treason and arrested in May 1660. 
His spies were able to intercept mail, and he exposed Edward Sexby's 1657 plot to assassinate Cromwell and captured would-be assassin Miles Sindercombe and his group. Ironically, Thurloe's own department was also infiltrated: his secretary Samuel Morland became a Royalist agent and in 1659 alleged that Thurloe, Richard Cromwell and Sir Richard Willis - a Sealed Knot member turned Cromwell agent - were plotting to kill the future King Charles II. About forty years after his death, a false ceiling was found in his rooms at Lincoln's Inn, the space was full of letters seized during his occupation of the office of Postmaster-General. These letters are now at the Bodleian Library.

In 1657 an Act entitled 'Postage of England, Scotland and Ireland Settled' set up a system for the British Isles and enacted the position of Postmaster General. The Act also reasserted the postal monopoly for letter delivery and for post horses. After the Restoration in 1660, a further Act (12 Car II, c.35) confirmed this and the post of Postmaster-General, the previous Cromwellian Act being void.

1660 saw the establishment of the General Letter Office, which would later become the General Post Office (GPO). A similar position evolved in the Kingdom of Scotland prior to the 1707 Act of Union.

The office was abolished in 1969 by the Post Office Act 1969. A new public corporation, governed by a chairman, was established under the name of the Post Office (the part later subsumed by Royal Mail), which also had responsibility for telecommunications and the Girobank). The cabinet position of Postmaster General was initially replaced by a Minister of Posts and Telecommunications with less direct involvement; this department was dissolved in March 1974, with regulatory functions transferring to the Home Office, the Post Office retaining control of television licensing. Since 1992, most regulatory functions formerly conducted by the Postmaster General generally fall within the remit of the Secretary of State for Digital, Culture, Media and Sport, although the present-day Royal Mail Group was overseen by the Secretary of State for Business, Energy and Industrial Strategy until flotation.

Masters of the King's Post

Postmaster under the Commonwealth

Postmasters General of England, Great Britain, and the United Kingdom
The earliest postmasters had responsibility for England and Wales. In 1707, on the Union with Scotland, the responsibility of the office was extended to cover the whole of the new Kingdom of Great Britain as well as Ireland, but with some powers held by a Post Office Manager for Scotland. By the Post Office (Revenues) Act 1710, with effect from 1711, the services were united, but with a Deputy Postmaster for Scotland. From 1784, there were also Postmasters General of Ireland, but from 1831, the postmasters based at Westminster became responsible for the whole of the United Kingdom of Great Britain and Ireland. In 1922, the Irish Free State became independent, and in 1923 it established its own arrangements under a Postmaster General of the Irish Free State. In 1924 the title became Minister for Posts and Telegraphs.

Two Postmasters General, 1691–1823
From 1691 to 1823 there were two Postmasters General, to divide the patronage between the Whigs and Tories.

A single Postmaster General, 1823–1900
In 1823 the idea of a Whig and a Tory sharing the post was abolished.

Postmaster General, 1900–1969

Minister of Posts and Telecommunications, 1969-1974

See also

 Postmaster General (disambiguation)
 Postmasters General of Ireland
 Postmaster General for Scotland
 Postmaster and Deputy Postmaster for Canada 1763–1851 – who reported to the Postmaster General of the United Kingdom
 Postmaster General of Canada
 Postmaster General of Hong Kong – created in 1870 to replace the Royal Mail and under British administration until 1 July 1997

References

External links
Postmaster General PDF

Lists of government ministers of the United Kingdom
Postal system of the United Kingdom
United Kingdom Postmasters General
Defunct ministerial offices in the United Kingdom
Ministries disestablished in 1969
1517 establishments in England